Fissistigma tungfangense is a species of plant in the Annonaceae family. It is endemic to China.

References

Annonaceae
Endemic flora of China
Critically endangered flora of Asia
Taxonomy articles created by Polbot